Murray Westgate (April 16, 1918 – August 27, 2018) was a Canadian actor. He is best known for his longtime role as a television pitchman in Canadian commercials for Esso on Hockey Night in Canada in the 1950s and 1960s, and also for his roles in Blue City Slammers, for which he garnered a Genie Award nomination as Best Supporting Actor at the 9th Genie Awards in 1988; and in the film adaptation of Two Solitudes, as the Prime Minister of Canada.

Early life 
Before becoming an actor, Westgate served as a radio operator in the Royal Canadian Navy during World War II. He then moved to Vancouver to join Everyman Theatre as an actor, before joining CBC Radio as an actor in radio dramas.

Career 
Westgate began appearing in Esso commercials in 1952, when the company signed on as the main commercial sponsor of Hockey Night in Canada, and retained this role until 1968.

He also had roles in the television series Jake and the Kid, R.C.M.P., Seaway, House of Pride and Seeing Things, and had some guest and supporting roles in television and theatrical films, but found that he sometimes lost out on roles because he was too recognizably typecast by the Esso commercials. He won an ACTRA Award in 1979 for his performance in the CBC Television film Tyler.

He was inducted into the Canadian Association of Broadcasters Hall of Fame in 2002.

Westgate's final acting job was in 1991, at the age of 72, a reprisal of his Esso attendant character for two commercials aired by Imperial Oil during that year's Stanley Cup playoffs. The spots featured both a black-and-white clip of one of his original Esso ads and newly recorded footage.

Westgate turned 100 on April 16, 2018. He died on August 27, 2018 at Sunnybrook Veterans Centre in Toronto, where he had lived for more than a decade.

Personal life
Westgate was married to actress Alice Hill until her death in 1983.

Filmography

References

External links 

1918 births
2018 deaths
Canadian male film actors
Canadian male television actors
Canadian male stage actors
Canadian male radio actors
Male actors from Regina, Saskatchewan
Royal Canadian Navy personnel
Canadian centenarians
Men centenarians